The 2012 Campeonato Paranaense de Futebol Profissional da 1ª Divisão was the 97th season of Paraná's top professional football league. The competition began on January 22 and will end on May 13. Coritiba won the championship for the 36th time, while Roma Apucarana and Iraty were relegated.

Format
The tournament consists of a double round-robin format, in which all twelve teams play each other twice, with classification split in two stages. Each round counts as one stage.

The better-placed teams of each stage will face themselves in a two-legged tie, with the team with the most points in the overall classification playing the second leg home, the winning team will then be declared champion. The finals are notable in the sense that goal difference will not be a tiebreaking criterion; if both teams tie on points the decision will go directly to a penalty shootout. If the same team is best-placed on both stages, it will automatically be declared champion.

The best two-placed teams in the overall classification not advancing to the finals and not from Curitiba will face themselves in a two-legged tie competing for the Torneio do Interior. The team with the most points will play the second leg home. The bottom two teams on overall classification will be relegated.

Participating teams

First round

Results

Second roud

Results

Overall classification

Finals

References

Campeonato Paranaense
Paranaense